Koraia was a town of ancient Caria, inhabited during the Hellenistic period. Its townsfolk appear in many inscriptions recovered in Caria.
 
Its site is located near Bağcılar in Asiatic Turkey.

References

Populated places in ancient Caria
Former populated places in Turkey